Nimbacinus dicksoni is an extinct thylacinid marsupial, a close relative of the recent but extinct thylacinid known as the Tasmanian tiger. It lived approximately 23-16 million years ago in the Miocene period. Nimbacinus dicksoni was about 1.6 ft (50 cm) long. Being a predator, it likely ate birds, small mammals, and reptiles. Like the recently-extinct thylacine, it may have been an awkward runner and used stamina to catch prey rather than speed. Fossils have been found in Australia at Riversleigh in north-western Queensland and Bullock Creek in the Northern Territory.

Like all thylacinids, Nimbacinus dicksoni was a dog-like marsupial, though its smaller size makes its appearance more comparable to that of a fox. Unlike its relatives, its jaws were likely strong enough for it to take down prey larger than itself.

The known material consists of a nearly complete skeleton, missing only the feet and tail, though the holotype consists only of upper and lower jaws found in a different part of the same fossil site. In terms of completeness, it is the best-known thylacinid, excluding the thylacine.

References

External links
 Australian Museum Nimbacinus dicksoni
Australia's lost kingdom
Australian Beast's
Australian Museum
Nimbacinus dicksoni information at The Thylacine Museum
Mikko's Phylogeny Archive
NIMBA CINUS DICKSONl, A PLESIOMORPHIC THYLACINE (MARSUPIALIA: THYLACINIDAE) FROM TERTIARY DEPOSITS OF QUEENSLAND AND THE NORTHERN TERRITORY J. MUIRHEAD AND M. ARCHER
Lorraeme Shume, “Drawing and modelling an extinct species”, The Science Show, 5 January 2013

Prehistoric mammals of Australia
Prehistoric thylacines
Oligocene marsupials
Miocene marsupials
Fossil taxa described in 1990
Riversleigh fauna